"Pennsylvania 6-5000" (also written "Pennsylvania Six-Five Thousand") is a 1940 swing jazz and pop standard with music by Jerry Gray and lyrics by Carl Sigman. It was recorded by Glenn Miller and His Orchestra as a Bluebird 78 rpm single.

Glenn Miller recording
Many big band names played in Hotel Pennsylvania's Cafe Rouge in New York City, including the Glenn Miller Orchestra. The hotel's telephone number, Pennsylvania 6-5000, inspired the Glenn Miller 1940 Top 5 Billboard hit of the same name, which had a 12-week chart run. The instrumental was recorded on April 28, 1940 in New York. The 78 single was released in June, 1940 as RCA Victor Bluebird 78 B-10754-A backed with "Rug Cutter's Swing". The song was also an advertisement for attendance at the band's live performances, as a call could be put through to Hotel Pennsylvania’s venue the Cafe Rouge for a reservation.

Personnel
 Saxophones: Hal McIntyre, Tex Beneke, Wilbur Schwartz, Ernie Caceres, Al Klink
 Trumpets: John Best, R. D. McMickle, Clyde Hurley, Legh Knowles
 Trombones: Glenn Miller, Jimmy Priddy, Paul Tanner, Frank D'Annolfo
 Piano: Chummy MacGregor
 String bass: Herman "Trigger" Alpert
 Guitar: Jack Lathrop
 Drums: Moe Purtill

According to a televised interview with John Best, he originally improvised the trumpet solo on the recording.

Other recordings
The song became a jazz and big band standard also recorded by the Andrews Sisters, Judy Garland and Martha Raye in a duet, the Brian Setzer Orchestra, Jimmy Mundy and His Orchestra (1959), Louise Gold, Kathy Miller, Martin Brushane Big Band, the Blue Moon Big Band (1999), in a 1976 Carol Burnett Show episode in a tribute to Glenn Miller, Syd Lawrence, Michael Maxwell and His Orchestra,  Richard Hunt and Jerry Nelson (Bobby Benson and the Baby Band) in The Muppet Show (1979, Episode 319), Fud Candrix and His Orchestra, Jerry Gray, Mina, Lou Haskins, Jack Livingston, Raquel Rastenni (1941) in Copenhagen, Starlight Orchestra, Klaus Wunderlich, New 101 Strings Orchestra, Heptet, Meco, Tex Beneke, The Modernaires, Jack Million Band, Al Pierson Big Band, BBC Big Band Orchestra, SWR Big Band, and by Captain Cook und seine singenden Saxophone in 2012.

Fats Waller's arrangement of the song for piano was published in the UK songbook Francis & Day's Album of Fats Waller: Musical Rhythms in the 1940s.

See also 
 Beechwood 4-5789
 867-5309/Jenny

References

Sources
Flower, John (1972). Moonlight Serenade: a bio-discography of the Glenn Miller Civilian Band. New Rochelle, NY: Arlington House. .
Miller, Glenn (1943). Glenn Miller's Method for Orchestral Arranging. New York: Mutual Music Society. ASIN: B0007DMEDQ
Simon, George Thomas (1980). Glenn Miller and His Orchestra. New York: Da Capo paperback. .
Simon, George Thomas (1971). Simon Says. New York: Galahad. .
Schuller, Gunther (1991). Volume 2 of The Swing Era: The Development of Jazz, 1930–1945. New York: Oxford University Press. .

Glenn Miller songs
1940s jazz standards
1940 songs
1940 singles
1940s instrumentals
Jazz compositions
Pop standards
Songs with music by Jerry Gray (arranger)
Jazz songs
Songs written by Carl Sigman
Songs about hotels and motels
Songs about New York City
Songs about Pennsylvania
Songs about telephone calls
Telephone numbers in the United States